Law of the land is a legal term referring to all the laws in force within a country or region.

Law of the Land may also refer to:

 Law of the Land (album), 1973 album by The Undisputed Truth
 "Law of the Land" (song), the title track of the album
 Law of the Land (TV series), Australian drama television show
 The Law of the Land (film), a 1917 silent film